The Christian Conservative Party (PCC) was a far-right conservative political party in Chile. It was officially recognized by the Electoral Service of Chile (Servel) on 30 October 2020.

The origins of the party date back to 2001, when the "Águilas de Jesús" movement emerged at the University of Concepción in order to compete for political spaces in the university. Its members are Evangelicals and Protestants.

In 2021 the Christian Conservative Party formed a coalition called the Christian Social Front with the Republican Party, and supported the Republican Party presidential candidate, José Antonio Kast. The party was dissolved in February 2022 because it did not receive at least 5% of the votes in the 2021 parliamentary elections to maintain its legality. Its members in the Chamber of Deputies thereafter sat as independents.

Presidential candidates 
The following is a list of the presidential candidates supported by the Christian Conservative Party. (Information gathered from the Archive of Chilean Elections).
2021: José Antonio Kast (lost)

Electoral history

Congress election

References

External links
 partidoconservadorcristiano.cl

2020 establishments in Chile
Conservative parties in Chile
Evangelicalism in Chile
Opposition to same-sex marriage
Political parties established in 2020
Protestant political parties
Social conservative parties
Political parties disestablished in 2022